"Midnight Flyer" is a popular song written by Mayme Watts and Robert Mosely. It was recorded in 1959 by Nat King Cole, peaking at number 12 on the Billboard R&B chart and number 23 on the UK Singles Chart.

Chart position

References

1959 singles
1959 songs
Nat King Cole songs
Songs written by Robert Mosley